Charing railway station serves the village of  Charing in Kent, England. The station, and all trains serving it, is operated by Southeastern.

The ticket office is staffed only during part of the day; at other times a PERTIS 'permit to travel' machine, located outside the station building on the 'down' side, suffices.

The next station eastwards (towards Ashford) used to be Hothfield, however it was closed in 1959, although it remained a 'request' stop for railway staff throughout the 1960s.

History 
 
In the wake of 1955 British Rail Modernisation plan, the "Kent Coast Electrification" scheme saw the suburban electrification of the previous Southern Railway extended from Maidstone East through to Ashford. The goods yard comprised five sidings on the down side and one on the up side. It was taken over for military use during World War II. Electrification also saw the addition of a footbridge, but by 16 May 1964 freight operations ceased. Charing's signal box closed on 14 April 1984, when the upgraded Maidstone East Panel took control of the whole line.

Services 

All services at Charing are operated by Southeastern using  and  EMUs.

The typical off-peak service in trains per hour is:
 1 tph to  via  
 1 tph to 

During the peak hours, the station is served by an additional hourly service between London Victoria and Ashford International, increasing the service to 2 tph in each direction.

References 

Sources

External links 

Transport in the Borough of Ashford
Railway stations in Kent
DfT Category E stations
Former London, Chatham and Dover Railway stations
Railway stations in Great Britain opened in 1884
Railway stations served by Southeastern
1884 establishments in England